The Ultimate Tour may refer to:

 The Ultimate Tour (Take That), a 2006 reunion tour by Take That
 Take That: The Ultimate Tour, a video release
 The Ultimate Tour (Steps), a 2012 concert tour by the Steps